Charity Ogbenyealu Adule (born 7 November 1993) is a Nigerian professional footballer who plays as a forward for Spanish Liga F club Alhama CF and the Nigeria women's national team. At a club level, she has played for Rivers Angels, Bayelsa Queens and BIIK Kazygurt.

Career

Club level
Adule started her career with the Rivers Angels and debuted at 14 years old at the Female Challenge Cup 2006. Her professional debut was against Pelican Stars, which she later described as the most memorable match of her career. She scored, and Rivers Angels placed third overall in the competition.

In the spring of 2011, she left the Rivers Angels and joined the professional female Football League club Bayelsa Queens in Yenagoa. Adule scored 57 goals in 40 games, for the Bayelsa Queens, and led to her in September 2014 signing a contract with Kazakh champions BIIK Kazygurt. She made her debut for BIIK in the UEFA Women's Champions League on 8 October 2014 against the German FFC Frankfurt.

Over the course of five years at BIIK, Adule won five league titles and reached the Round of 16 of the 2016-17 UEFA Women's Champions League. During the course of the campaign she scored goals against Wexford Youths, Gintra Universitetas, Verona and Paris Saint-Germain.

On 19 September 2019, Adule was announced as a new signing for Spanish side SD Eibar ahead of the 2019-20 season.

International
Adule played for Nigeria U20 at the 2010 FIFA U-20 Women's World Cup in Germany and the 2012 FIFA U-20 Women's World Cup in Japan. Since 2013, Adule has played for the Nigeria women's national football team.

In November 2018, she revealed she had rejected approaches to represent the Kazakhstan women's national football team.

Honours

Club
 BIIK Kazygurt
Kazakhstani Women's Football Championship (5): 2014, 2015, 2016, 2017, 2018
Kazakhstan Women's Cup (5): 2014, 2015, 2016, 2017, 2018

Personal life 
She is a supporter of London-based men's football club, Chelsea F.C. Adule is religious, and attributes her any plans in her future to God, saying "God has the final say in my life. I believe the Almighty God who made me to be here today will take me to the final place He made for me. Everything in life is all about the favour of God, I believe with His favour upon me, I will go far."

References 

 

1993 births
Living people
Women's association football forwards
Nigerian women's footballers
Nigeria women's international footballers
Rivers Angels F.C. players
Segunda Federación (women) players
SD Eibar Femenino players
Nigerian expatriate women's footballers
Nigerian expatriate sportspeople in Kazakhstan
Expatriate women's footballers in Kazakhstan
Nigerian expatriate sportspeople in Spain
Expatriate women's footballers in Spain
Bayelsa Queens F.C. players
BIIK Kazygurt players
Sportspeople from Warri